Katja Wächter (born 28 January 1982 in Leipzig, Sachsen) is a German foil fencer. In 2009, Wachter won a silver medal for the same weapon at the European Championships in Plovdiv, Bulgaria, and bronze, as a member of the German fencing team, at the World Championships in Antalya, Turkey.

Wachter represented Germany at the 2008 Summer Olympics in Beijing, where she competed in two foil events. For her first event, the women's individual foil, Wachter defeated Peru's María Luisa Doig, Romania's Cristina Stahl, and France's Corinne Maîtrejean in the preliminary rounds, before losing out the quarterfinal match to Italy's Giovanna Trillini, with a score of 8–15. Few days later, she joined with her fellow fencers and teammates Melanie Wolgast, Anja Schache, and Carolin Golubytskyi for the women's team foil. Wachter and her team, however, lost the fifth place match to the Chinese team (led by Zhang Lei), with a total score of 28 touches.

References

External links
Profile – FIE
EuroFencing Profile
NBC 2008 Olympics profile

German female fencers
Living people
Olympic fencers of Germany
Fencers at the 2008 Summer Olympics
Sportspeople from Leipzig
1982 births